This is a list of characters in the American television medical drama series Nip/Tuck.

Main characters

Major characters

Primary antagonists (villains)

Other characters

References

Lists of American drama television series characters